François Taillandier (born in 1955, Clermont-Ferrand, France) is a French writer portraying the French contemporary society.

Life
Henri Vernes, creator of Bob Morane, fired a passion the 12-year-old Taillandier was not going to give up.
In 1968 he began to read Honoré de Balzac. This classic French writer and Edmond Rostand, Cyrano's father, had a strong influence on him. Attending classical literature studies in the university, he graduated in 1977 with a memoir about the Marquis de Sade.

In 1979 he taught literature for 4 years before resigning from his position to become a full-time writer.

In 1984 he became journalist for the Revue Hebdo. Taillandier finds the inspiration walking in Paris, listening conversations while in the bistros. In 2006 he was appointed president of the Société des gens de lettres. Taillandier, divorcé, is the father of three.

Works
In 1990 he published Les Clandestins, rewarded by the Prix Jean-Freustié. In 1992 the novel Les Nuits Racine received the Roger Nimier Prize.
In 1999 Anielka is published and received the Grand Prix du roman de l'Académie française.

In 2005 he published Option Paradis, the first novel in a series of a five-interlinked novels cycle, divided in fifty-five chapters (eleven chapters each novel) called La Grande Intrigue (The Big Plot), reviving a French classical literature tradition (La Comédie Humaine by Honoré de Balzac, Les Rougon-Macquart by Émile Zola). Following the evolution of five families through five generations, this work will be completed in 2010, celebrating the Taillandier's fifty-fifth anniversary. Telling, the second novel of this series was published in 2006.

Present days
He currently writes for French newspapers Le Figaro, l'Humanité et la Montagne and keeps developing La Grande Intrigue, writing "only when everybody is sleeping".

Bibliography

Novels
Personages de la rue du Couteau (Julliard, 1984)
Tott (Julliard, 1985)
Benoît ou les contemporains obscurs (Julliard, 1986)
Les clandestins (De Fallois, 1990)
Les Nuits Racine (De Fallois, 1992)
Mémoires de Monte-Cristo (De Fallois, 1994)
Des hommes qui s'éloignent (Fayard, 1997)
Anielka (Stock, 1999)
Journal de Marseille (Rocher, 1999)
N6, La route de l'Italie (Stock, 2000)
Le cas Gentile, (Stock, 2001)
Option paradis (Stock, 2005)
Telling (Stock, 2006)
Il n'y a personne dans les tombes (Stock, 2007)

Short stories
Intrigues (00h00 editions, 2001)

Essays
Aragon (Fayard, 1997)
Borges  (François Bourin, 1993)
Les parents lâcheurs (Rocher, 2001)

Biography
Balzac (Gallimard, Folio)

Citations
Tout une part de la production romanesque contemporaine est rassurante. Ce sont des romans qui miment le roman. Ils trahissent une grande nostalgie pour le passé.

References 

20th-century French non-fiction writers
21st-century French non-fiction writers
Grand Prix du roman de l'Académie française winners
French Roman Catholic writers
Roger Nimier Prize winners
Prix Jean Freustié winners
Writers from Clermont-Ferrand
1955 births
Living people
20th-century French male writers
French male non-fiction writers
Le Figaro people